John William Murphy (21 November 1921 – 2004) was an English professional footballer who played as a wing half.

Career
Murphy began his career with Heckmondwike Spen and Liverpool, before turning professional with Bradford City in 1946. Murphy made 146 appearances in the Football League for Bradford, scoring nine goals. He later played non-league football with Scarborough and Weybridge.

References

1921 births
2004 deaths
People from Birstall, West Yorkshire
English footballers
Liverpool F.C. players
Bradford City A.F.C. players
Scarborough F.C. players
English Football League players
Association football midfielders